A mountain troll (bergatroll) is a type of troll in Scandinavian folklore.

Mountain troll may also refer to:

Troll (Harry Potter), in the Harry Potter book series by J. K. Rowling
Troll (Middle-earth), in J. R. R. Tolkien's Middle-earth writings

See also
Bergatrollets frieri (Swedish folk ballad)